Vikram University is located in Ujjain, Madhya Pradesh, India.

The university was named after the ruler Vikramaditya. It was established in 1957. It was  evaluated by the National Assessment and Accreditation Council and was awarded B++ grade.

History

Vikram University was established in Ujjain on 1 March 1957. Shri Ranchod Lalji Dhabai donated the land for it from Barnagar. The foundation stone of Vikram University was laid by the then Home Minister of India Shri Govind Vallabh Pant on 23 October 1956. The function was presided over by the Rajpramukh of Madhya Bharat State Late Jiwajirao Scindia.

The state of Madhya Pradesh was formed in 1956, and Madhya Bharat was merged into it. The Act relating to the University was accordingly amended. The amended Act of Vikram University No. 13, 1957 was published in Madhya Pradesh Gazette on 16 August 1957.

The University's jurisdiction diminished due to the 1964-65 formation of Indore University, Gwalior and Bhopal University during 1969-70. On 20 April 1973, the Governor granted permission to bring about homogeneity in the organization and administration of Madhya Pradesh Universities. This permission was first published in the Madhya Pradesh Gazette (extraordinary) on 23 April 1973. By a notification of the Education Department 940/20/8/71 dated 3 May 1973, the by-laws of the Madhya Pradesh Universities Act No. 1 to 19 were brought into effect from 25 September 1973, No. 20 to 26 from 1 December 1973, and No. 27 to 31 from 4 May 1974, for all the Universities of Madhya Pradesh (including Vikram University).

The Madhya Pradesh Universities Act was amended and published in Madhya Pradesh Gazette on 28 June 1985. As per the amendment, University Jurisdiction was redefined and demarcated in accordance with the Revenue districts of Ujjain Division, including Ujjain, Ratlam, Mandsaur, Neemuch, Shajapur and Dewas. Because of the new jurisdiction, the number of affiliated colleges decreased, and some new colleges were granted affiliation.

Satellite campus
The University Schools and Administrative blocks are connected to the satellite. Over 500 online research journals/magazines are available. MoU's with international universities facilitate a global perspective.

Vikram Vatika zoo is situated on campus.

Research and extensions
The University has undertaken research and extension work incorporating various knowledge streams. The projects are funded by University Grants Commission (UGC), Department of Science and Technology (DST), Indian Space Research Organisation (ISRO), All India Council for Technical Education(AICTE), and Defence Research and Development Organisation (DRDO).

Organisation and administration

Institutes

School of Engineering and Technology 
The university's department of engineering is an AICTE approved, self-financed government institute. The Kaushal Vikas Kendra skill development initiative trains students of different streams in technical trades.

Institute of Pharmacy 
The pharmacy department was established in 2003, offering a degree. Admission is on the basis of an entrance exam. The institute got approval from PCI to enroll 60 students. Institute of Pharmacy does not require approval from AICTE to run any course.

The institute employs Master of Pharma faculty and PhD head. It includes faculty for non-pharma subjects.

Institute of Computer Science
The Institute of Computer Science opened in 2005. It offers Bachelor of Computer Applications (BCA) and postgraduate courses (M.C.A and M.Sc.) and a Research Program (M.Phil. and PhD).

Institute of Business Management
The Pt. Jawaharlal Nehru Institute of Business Management was established in 1957.

The campus includes e-classes that enable the lecturers to educate using computers, a library 20,000 volume library, net labs and a 2-acre campus.

Courses offered are MBA (regular and part-time).

Faculties and schools
Faculty of Arts
School of Studies in English
School of Studies in Foreign Languages
School of Studies in Hindi
School of Studies in JyotirVigyan
School of Studies in Sanskrit
School of Studies in Philosophy

Faculty of Physical Sciences
School of Studies in Chemistry and Bio-Chemistry
School of Studies in Earth Science
School of Studies in Geology
School of Studies in Mathematics
School of Studies in Physics
School of Studies in Statistics
Institute of Pharmacy

Faculty of Education
School of Studies in Continuing Education

Faculty of Commerce
School of Studies in Commerce

Faculty of Information Technology
Institute of Computer Science
School of Studies in Library & Information Science

Faculty of Management
Pt. J.N. Institute of Business Management

Faculty of Social Sciences
School of Studies in Ancient Indian History, Culture and Archaeology
School of Studies in Economics
School of Studies in Political Science and Public Administration
School of Studies in Sociology
Ambedkar Peeth

Faculty of Life Sciences
Institute of Environment Management & Plant Sciences - Environment
Institute of Environment Management & Plant Sc.- Microbiology
School of Studies in Botany
School of Studies in Zoology and Biotechnology

Affiliated colleges
Its jurisdiction extends over 7 districts - Agar Malwa,Dewas,Mandsaur,Neemuch,Ratlam,Shajapur,Ujjain        .

Notable alumni 

Kaptan Singh Solanki, Governor of Punjab and Haryana
Najma Heptulla, Governor of Manipur
Vijay Kumar Patodi, Indian mathematician
V. K. Chaturvedi, mechanical engineer and a nuclear power expert
Sachida Nagdev, contemporary Indian artist 
Asghar Ali Engineer,  Indian reformist, writer and social activist
Raghunandan Sharma, politician
Satyanarayan Jatiya, politician 
Pushpa Devi Singh, politician
B. M. Choudary, inorganic chemist, Shanti Swarup Bhatnagar laureate
G. V. R. Prasad, paleontologist, Shanti Swarup Bhatnagar laureate
Babulal Gaur, former Chief Minister of Madhya Pradesh
 Zafar Ahmad Nizami, former Dean of Political Science department of Jamia Millia Islamia and renowned author of Urdu.
 Thawar Chand Gehlot, 19th Governor of Karnataka and former BJP MLA
  Kantilal Bhuria, is an Indian politician and a member of Indian National Congress and was till July 2011 the Minister of Tribal Affairs of the Republic of India.

References

External links
Vikram University website

 
Educational institutions established in 1957
Buildings and structures in Ujjain
1957 establishments in Madhya Pradesh